Trito is a significant figure in Proto-Indo-European mythology, representing the first warrior and acting as a culture hero. He is connected to other prominent characters, such as Manu and Yemo, and is recognized as the protagonist of the myth of the warrior function, establishing the model for all later men of arms. In the legend, Trito is offered cattle as a divine gift by celestial gods, which is later stolen by a three-headed serpent named * ('serpent'; and the Indo-European root for negation). Despite initial defeat, Trito, fortified by an intoxicating drink and aided by the Sky-Father , or alternatively the Storm-God or *Haner, 'Man', together they go to a cave or a mountain, and the hero overcomes the monster and returns the recovered cattle to a priest for it to be properly sacrificed. He is now the first warrior, maintaining through his heroic deeds the cycle of mutual giving between gods and mortals., thereby maintaining the cycle of mutual giving between gods and mortals. Scholars have interpreted the story of Trito either as a cosmic conflict between the heavenly hero and the earthly serpent or as an Indo-European victory over non-Indo-European people, with the monster symbolizing the aboriginal thief or usurper. Trito's character served as a model for later cattle raiding epic myths and was seen as providing moral justification for cattle raising. The legend of Trito is generally accepted among scholars and is recognized as an essential part of Proto-Indo-European mythology, although not to the level of Manu and Yemo.

History of research 
Following a first paper on the cosmogonical legend of Manu and Yemo, published simultaneously with Jaan Puhvel in 1975 (who pointed out the Roman reflex of the story), Bruce Lincoln assembled the initial part of the myth with the legend of the third man Trito in a single ancestral motif.

Since the 1970s, the reconstructed motifs of Manu and Yemo, and to a lesser extent that of Trito, have been generally accepted among scholars.

Trifunctional hypothesis 
According to Lincoln the legend of Trito should be interpreted as "a myth of the warrior function, establishing the model for all later men of arms". While Manu and Yemo seem to be the protagonists of "a myth of the sovereign function, establishing the model for later priests and kings",  The myth indeed recalls the Dumézilian tripartition of the cosmos between the priest (in both his magical and legal aspects), the warrior (the Third Man), and the herder (the cow).

The story of Trito served as a model for later cattle raiding epic myths and most likely as a moral justification for the practice of raiding among Indo-European peoples. In the original legend, Trito is only taking back what rightfully belongs to his people, those who sacrifice properly to the gods. The myth has been interpreted either as a cosmic conflict between the heavenly hero and the earthly serpent, or as an Indo-European victory over non-Indo-European people, the monster symbolizing the aboriginal thief or usurper.

Trito and Ngwhi 
Cognates stemming from the First Warrior *Trito ('Third') include the Vedic Trita, the hero who recovered the stolen cattle from the serpent Vṛtrá; the Avestan Thraētona ('son of Thrita'), who won back the abducted women from the serpent Aži Dahāka; and the Norse þriði ('Third'), one of the names of Óðinn. Other cognates may appear in the Greek expressions trítos sōtḗr (τρίτος σωτήρ; 'Third Saviour'), an epithet of Zeus, and tritogḗneia (τριτογήνεια; 'Third born' or 'born of Zeus'), an epithet of Athena; and perhaps in the Slavic mythical hero Troyan, found in Russian and Serbian legends alike.

*Ngwhi, a term meaning 'serpent', is also related to the Indo-European root for negation (*ne-). Descendent cognates can be found in the Iranian Aži, the name of the inimical serpent, and in the Indic áhi ('serpent'), a term used to designate the monstrous serpent Vṛtrá, both descending from Proto-Indo-Iranian *aj'hi.

Serpent-slaying myth 
One common myth found in nearly all Indo-European mythologies is a battle ending with a hero or god slaying a serpent or dragon of some sort. Although the details of the story often vary widely, several features remain remarkably the same in all iterations. The protagonist of the story is usually a thunder-god, or a hero somehow associated with thunder. His enemy the serpent is generally associated with water and depicted as multi-headed, or else "multiple" in some other way. Indo-European myths often describe the creature as a "blocker of waters", and his many heads get eventually smashed up by the thunder-god in an epic battle, releasing torrents of water that had previously been pent up. The original legend may have symbolized the Chaoskampf, a clash between forces of order and chaos. The dragon or serpent loses in every version of the story, although in some mythologies, such as the Norse Ragnarök myth, the hero or the god dies with his enemy during the confrontation. Historian Bruce Lincoln has proposed that the dragon-slaying tale and the creation myth of *Trito killing the serpent * may actually belong to the same original story. 

Reflexes of the Proto-Indo-European dragon-slaying myth appear in most Indo-European poetic traditions, where the myth has left traces of the formulaic sentence *(h₁e) gʷʰent h₁ógʷʰim, meaning "[he] slew the serpent". In Hittite mythology, the storm god Tarhunt slays the giant serpent Illuyanka, as does the Vedic god Indra the multi-headed serpent Vritra, which has been causing a drought by trapping the waters in his mountain lair.
 Several variations of the story are also found in Greek mythology. The original motif appears inherited in the legend of Zeus slaying the hundred-headed Typhon, as related by Hesiod in the Theogony, and possibly in the myth of Heracles slaying the nine-headed Lernaean Hydra and in the legend of Apollo slaying the earth-dragon Python. The story of Heracles's theft of the cattle of Geryon is probably also related. Although he is not usually thought of as a storm deity in the conventional sense, Heracles bears many attributes held by other Indo-European storm deities, including physical strength and a knack for violence and gluttony.

The original motif is also reflected in Germanic mythology. The Norse god of thunder Thor slays the giant serpent Jörmungandr, which lived in the waters surrounding the realm of Midgard. In the Völsunga saga, Sigurd slays the dragon Fafnir and, in Beowulf, the eponymous hero slays a different dragon. The depiction of dragons hoarding a treasure (symbolizing the wealth of the community) in Germanic legends may also be a reflex of the original myth of the serpent holding waters.

In Zoroastrianism and in Persian mythology, Fereydun (and later Garshasp) slays the serpent Zahhak. In Albanian mythology, the drangue, semi-human divine figures associated with thunders, slay the kulshedra, huge multi-headed fire-spitting serpents associated with water and storms. The Slavic god of storms Perun slays his enemy the dragon-god Veles, as does the bogatyr hero Dobrynya Nikitich to the three-headed dragon Zmey. A similar execution is performed by the Armenian god of thunders Vahagn to the dragon Vishap, by the Romanian knight hero Făt-Frumos to the fire-spitting monster Zmeu, and by the Celtic god of healing Dian Cecht to the serpent Meichi.

In Shinto, where Indo-European influences through Vedic religion can be seen in mythology, the storm god Susanoo slays the eight-headed serpent Yamata no Orochi.

The Genesis narrative of Judaism and Christianity can be interpreted as a more allegorical retelling of the serpent-slaying myth. The Deep or Abyss from or on top of which God is said to make the world is translated from the Biblical Hebrew Tehom (Hebrew: תְּהוֹם). Tehom is a cognate of the Akkadian word tamtu and Ugaritic t-h-m which have similar meaning. As such it was equated with the earlier Babylonian serpent Tiamat.

Folklorist Andrew Lang suggests that the serpent-slaying myth morphed into a folktale motif of a frog or toad blocking the flow of waters.

See Also 

 Manu and Yemo
 Hercules
 Vahagn

Notes

References

Bibliography 

 

 
 

Indo-European religion
Proto-Indo-European mythology
Origin myths
Reconstructed words